Robert J. Osterhaus (born January 30, 1931) is an American politician in the state of Iowa.

Osterhaus was born in Dyersville, Iowa. He attended the University of Iowa and is a pharmacist. A Democrat, he served in the Iowa House of Representatives from 1995 to 2005 (34th district from 1995 to 2003 and 25th district from 2003 to 2005).

References

1931 births
Living people
People from Dyersville, Iowa
University of Iowa alumni
American pharmacists
Democratic Party members of the Iowa House of Representatives